The Lehner Mammoth-Kill Site is in southern Arizona (Cochise County) on the west bank of the San Pedro River 1.5 miles southwest of the town of Hereford. It is significant for its association with evidence that mammoths were killed here by Paleo-Indians 11, 000 to 12,000 years Before Present.

The Lehner Mammoth-Kill Site was declared a National Historic Landmark in 1967. In 1988, Mr. and Mrs. Lehner donated the site to the Bureau of Land Management for the benefit and education of the public.

Archaeology
In 1952, Ed Lehner discovered extinct mammoth bone fragments on his ranch, at the locality now known as the Lehner Mammoth-Kill Site. He notified the Arizona State Museum, and a summer of heavy rains in 1955 exposed more bones. Excavations, led by William W. Wasley and Emil Haury, took place in 1955–56, and again in 1974–75. In the initial effort, thirteen fluted projectile points, with 2 damaged, and 8 stone tools were found as well as 9 mammoth remains, one bison, a horse, and a tapir. The Clovis points were of chert, clear quartz, and chalcedony. Two hearths were discovered and sampled for radiocarbon dating. During the 1975 excavation the remains of a juvenile American Mastodon were found.

Bones of a variety of game—twelve immature mammoths, one horse, one tapir, several bison, one camel, one bear, several rabbits, and a garter snake—were excavated at the Lehner site.

The Lehner Mammoth kill and camp site exhibited a number of firsts: It was the first site associated with the Clovis culture to have definable fire hearths. These hearths provided the first radiocarbon dates for the culture (9,000 BCE).

This site was also the first to have butchering tools in direct association with animal remains, and the first Clovis association with small animals, camel, and tapir.

In addition to the obvious artifact remains, an inter-disciplinary group of scientists including archaeologists, botanists, geochronologists, geologists, paleontologists, palynologists, and zoologists have studied and interpreted a wide range of data from the site.

See also
 Naco Mammoth Kill Site

References

External links

Arizonan Lives With Mammoths in His Back Yard - Los Angeles Times - LEO W. BANKS - Dec. 27, 1990
 Obituary, Edward Lehner (1914–2003)

Clovis sites
Pleistocene
Native American history of Arizona
Cenozoic paleontological sites of North America
Pre-Columbian archaeological sites
Archaeological sites on the National Register of Historic Places in Arizona
National Historic Landmarks in Arizona
History of Cochise County, Arizona
Protected areas of Cochise County, Arizona
Bureau of Land Management areas in Arizona
Paleontology in Arizona
National Register of Historic Places in Cochise County, Arizona
Fossil parks in the United States